Ayi is a unisex given name. Notable people with the name include:

Ayi Jihu (born 1984), Chinese singer
Ayi Kwei Armah (born 1939), Ghanaian writer
Ayi Sutarno (21st century), Indonesian tennis player
Vissinto Ayi d'Almeida (21st century), Beninese diplomat

Unisex given names